Gurmeet Singh may refer to:
 Gurmeet Singh (racewalker), Indian athlete
 Gurmeet Singh (footballer), Indian footballer
 Gurmeet Ram Rahim Singh, head of the Indian social group Dera Sacha Sauda

See also
 Gurmit Singh, Singaporean actor
 Gurmit Singh (general), Indian Army officer